James Eugene Burke (born September 24, 1971) is a former Major League Baseball catcher. He attended Oregon State University, where, along with baseball, he played for the school's football team as the kicker. He now resides in his hometown of Roseburg.

Professional career

Minor League journeyman, 1993 to 2003
Burke was originally drafted by the California Angels in the ninth round of the  amateur draft. He was signed as a free agent by the Chicago White Sox on January 27, .

Chicago White Sox
Burke played 73 games in the Major Leagues for the White Sox from 2003–.

Texas Rangers, return to the minors
The Texas Rangers signed Burke to a minor league deal near the end of the 2005 season. He did not appear in an MLB game during the  season.

A chance with the Mariners
As a non-roster invitee in the Mariners' camp during spring training , he beat out incumbent René Rivera for the backup catcher job going into Opening Day. On September 30, 2007, on the last day of the regular season, Burke hit his first career home run against A. J. Murray of the Texas Rangers.

On July 6, Burke was pressed into service on the pitcher's mound in the 15th inning of a game against Detroit when the Mariners ran out of pitchers; he was credited with the loss. Burke allowed one hit and a run. The run scored after a lead off double, wild pitch, and sacrifice fly. Burke had previously made four pitching appearances in the minor leagues.

Following the 2008 season, Burke was non-tendered by the Mariners, making him a free agent. He was re-signed by the Mariners to a minor league contract on December 23, saying this about the situation,

The best gift would have been a major-league deal, but I'm pretty happy about this. This is a place I wanted to be. It's a situation I like and one that I think could work out very well.

Burke was added to the active roster on April 16, 2009, following an injury to starting catcher Kenji Johjima. When Johjima returned from the disabled list on May 1, Burke was outrighted back to Tacoma; after clearing waivers, he accepted the assignment.

On June 7, Burke was recalled up from Tacoma after the Mariners designated pitcher Denny Stark for assignment. In a winning effort, Burke went 2-5 with a home run and a base hit.

On June 26, Johjima was activated from the disabled list. To make room for Johjima on the 25-man roster, the Mariners designated Burke for assignment. Seattle assigned him to Tacoma.

Washington Nationals
On September 17,  Burke was traded to the Washington Nationals for cash considerations, and was added to the Nats' active roster as a September call-up. The following year, his knee was injured, and he did not play his first game at the Nationals' AAA affiliate Syracuse until May 25. But after injuries to starter Iván Rodríguez and backup catcher Carlos Maldonado, he was called up on June 4, and got into his first game two days later. However, four days later, Burke was designated for assignment after making only one appearance to make way for Rodríguez, who was recalled from his rehab assignment in the minors.

Coaching career
Burke retired after the 2010 season and became the manager of the Class-A Cedar Rapids Kernels.

Burke was named manager of class 1A Burlington Bees in 2013.

References

External links

1971 births
Living people
American expatriate baseball players in Canada
Anaheim Angels players
Chicago White Sox players
Seattle Mariners players
Washington Nationals players
Major League Baseball catchers
Baseball players from Oregon
Oregon State Beavers baseball players
Sportspeople from Roseburg, Oregon
Boise Hawks players
Cedar Rapids Kernels players
Lake Elsinore Storm players
Midland Angels players
Vancouver Canadians players
Edmonton Trappers players
Salt Lake Stingers players
Charlotte Knights players
Oklahoma RedHawks players
Tacoma Rainiers players
Syracuse Chiefs players
Minor league baseball managers